Constitution of 1911 may refer to:

Greek Constitution of 1911
Monegasque Constitution of 1911
Portuguese Constitution of 1911